The  is a plain in the Western Province in Zambia.

Moukoko or Mukoko is a surname of Cameroonian origin. Notable people with the surname include:
Pierre Moukoko Mbonjo (born 1954), Cameroonian politician
Tonton Zola Moukoko (born 1983), Swedish former footballer
Youssoufa Moukoko (born 2004), German footballer
Dieumerci Mukoko Amale (born 1998), Congolese professional
Jestina Mukoko,  Zimbabwean human rights activist
Daniel Mukoko Samba (born 1959), is a politician from the Democratic Republic of the Congo
Mukoko Batezadio (born 1992), Congolese international footballer
Mukoko Tonombe (born 1996), Congolese professional footballer

Surnames of West African origin
Surnames of Cameroonian origin
Surnames of the Democratic Republic of the Congo